Frank Andrew Parker (born Franciszek Andrzej Pajkowski, January 31, 1916 – July 24, 1997) was an amateur & later professional American male tennis player of Polish immigrant parents who was active in the 1930s and 1940s. He won four Grand Slam singles titles as well as three doubles titles.

Early life
Parker was born on January 31, 1916, in Milwaukee as Franciszek Andrzej Pajkowski and had three brothers and a sister. Franciszek changed his name to Frank Parker when the sports announcers couldn't pronounce his Polish name. He learnt to play tennis at age 10, hitting discarded tennis balls at the Milwaukee Town Club. There he was discovered by the club coach Mercer Beasley who noticed his quickness and accuracy. Aged 12, he won his first national title, the boys' indoor championship played at the Seventh Regiment Armory in New York. At age 15, Paikowski become the national boys' champion in singles, defeating Gene Mako in the final, and a year later, at age 16, he won the national junior singles title as well as the singles title at the Canadian National Championships. In 1933, when he was 17, he won the singles title at the U.S. Men's Clay Court Championships, defeating Gene Mako in the final in straight sets. Following success in these championships, Frank earned the nickname "Boy Wonder of Tennis."

Career
Parker is one of the few Americans to win both the French Championships (1948, 1949) and the U.S. Championships (1944, 1945).

Parker became the singles champion at Cincinnati, then called the Tri–State Tennis Tournament, in 1941 and was a four-time singles finalist (1932, 1933, 1938, 1939). He won the Canadian title in 1932 and again in 1938. He was ranked World No. 1 amateur in 1948 by John Olliff of The Daily Telegraph.

Writing about Parker in his 1949 autobiography, Bobby Riggs, who had played Parker many times, stated "Parker is a tough man to get past. Equipped with a wonderful all-court game, he plays intently and with classic form. His footwork is marvelous. You never see Frankie hitting the ball from an awkward position." In his autobiography, Jack Kramer wrote "even as a boy (Parker) had this wonderful, slightly overspin forehand drive. Clean and hard. Then for some reason, Frankie's coach, Mercer Beasley, decided to change this stroke into a chop. It was obscene." It impaired his game, particularly in preventing him from getting to the net, and Parker dropped in the rankings. A few years later, he worked hard to regain his original forehand, and according to Kramer, greatly improved his stroke, but it never was as good as it had once been. Parker was known for having a "deadpan" persona on court.

Parker took part in the 1968 US Open at the age of 52, becoming the oldest player to compete in the US Open men's singles. He also had the longest span in Grand Slam men's singles history (36 years from his first appearance at the U.S. Championships in 1932 to his last appearance in 1968).

Between 1937 and 1948, Parker took part in seven Davis Cup ties with the U.S. team and won the Davis Cup in 1937 and 1948.  He compiled a Davis Cup record of 12 wins and two losses.

In October 1949, Parker signed a one-year contract with Bobby Riggs to become a professional tennis player.

Parker was elected to the Wisconsin Athletic Hall of Fame in 1960.

Parker was inducted into the International Tennis Hall of Fame in Newport, Rhode Island in 1966 and into the National Polish American Sports Hall of Fame in 1988.

Personal life
On March 17, 1938, Parker married Audrey Beasley who previously divorced Parker's coach Mercer Beasley. She became his adviser and tailored his tennis wardrobe. His wife died in 1971, and in 1979, Parker retired from his position of salesman for a corrugated box company.

Grand Slam finals

Singles (4 titles, 2 runner-ups)

Doubles (3 titles, 2 runner-ups)

Performance timeline
Parker joined the professional tennis circuit in 1949 and as a consequence was banned from competing in the amateur Grand Slams until the start of the Open Era.

(A*) 1-set matches in preliminary rounds.

Notes

References

Sources
 Tennis Is My Racket, by Bobby Riggs, New York, 1949
 The Game, My 40 Years in Tennis, Jack Kramer with Frank Deford, New York, 1979
 How to Play Tennis, by Mercer Beasley, 1935
 Frank Parker: Champion in the Golden Age of Tennis, by Cynthia Beardsley, 2002

External links
 
 
 
 

1916 births
1997 deaths
American male tennis players
American people of Polish descent
French Championships (tennis) champions
Sportspeople from Milwaukee
International Tennis Hall of Fame inductees
Tennis people from Wisconsin
United States National champions (tennis)
Wimbledon champions (pre-Open Era)
Grand Slam (tennis) champions in men's singles
Grand Slam (tennis) champions in men's doubles
Professional tennis players before the Open Era
World number 1 ranked male tennis players